Berte is a name of Old German origin. Notable persons with that name include:

People with the given name 
 Berte Canutte Aarflot (1795–1859), Norwegian Christian hymnwriter within the Haugean Movement
 Berte Rognerud (1907–1997), Norwegian politician for the Conservative Party
 Berte Skeel (1644–1720), Danish noble, philanthropist and estate owner.

People with the surname 
 Domenica Bertè (1947–1995), birthname of the Italian leading pop music singer Mia Martini
 Harry Berte (1872–1952), American Major League Baseball player
 Heinrich Berté (born Heinrich Bettelheim), Austria-Hungarian composer of operas and operettas
 Loredana Bertè (born 1950), Italian prominent singer-songwriter

See also 
 Berth (disambiguation)
 Berti, a given name and surname
 Bertie (disambiguation)

References